"Oliver!" is the title song from the 1960s original West End and Broadway musical Oliver! and the 1968 film of the same name.

Background

The song begins with the workhouse boys and Mr. Bumble praying for the food they will receive and for a blessing of thankfulness. However, Oliver asks for more gruel and that makes Mr. Bumble and the Widow Corney very angry at him and they think of ways to punish him for his ingratitude and ask who he is. The punishment that Oliver is to receive, as stated in the song is that he is to be sent down a stairway without a bannister and to be fed cockroaches served in a canister or they would push Oliver up a chimney full of soot. Even the Board of Governors is stunned by Oliver's ingratitude and join in the song (but only in the West End productions). The punishment that the Board of Governors suggest is that Oliver should be imprisoned and put up for sale for apprenticeship, though their lyrics are cut from the Broadway version.

Songs about children
Songs about fictional male characters
Songs written by Lionel Bart
Songs from Oliver!
1960 songs